Island Lake is an unincorporated community in Saint Louis County, Minnesota, United States.

The community is located 18 miles north of the city of Duluth on Saint Louis County Road 4 (Rice Lake Road).

Island Lake is located within Gnesen Township and Fredenberg Township.  Boulder Lake is also in the vicinity.

Local business establishments include the Island Lake Inn, Porky's Truck Stop, and Boondocks Saloon and Grill.

References

 Official State of Minnesota Highway Map – 2011/2012 edition
 Mn/DOT map of Saint Louis County – Sheet 2 – 2011 edition

Unincorporated communities in Minnesota
Unincorporated communities in St. Louis County, Minnesota